The Burning of Imperial Palace ( is a 1983 historical drama film directed by Li Han-hsiang. Based on the events in China during the Second Opium War which culminated in the burning of the Old Summer Palace (aka. Yuanming Garden), the film stars Tony Leung Ka-fai as the Xianfeng Emperor and Liu Xiaoqing as a young nobel consort Cixi.

Plot
In 1852, a 17-year-old girl named Yulan is selected into the Imperial Harem at a triennial selection. Although her beauty is outstanding, she is never given any chance to get closer to the Xianfeng Emperor due to the fact that an ancestor of her clan, the Yehenara clan once vowed to destroy the rival imperial Aisin Gioro clan at a woman's hands. One day, while the Emperor is walking in the Yuanming Garden, he is attracted by a song which apparently was sung by Yulan, who was nearby. Falling in love with her temperament, the Emperor first promotes Yulan to the rank of concubine, and further elevates her as a noble consort when she gives birth to his only son one year later.

Since then, the imperial couple has enjoyed their marriage life in the Yuanming Garden, where the Emperor often teaches the noble consort how to reply to reports from regional officials. When the Emperor is confronted with the advance of an joint Anglo-French force, Yulan suggests appointing Yixin, Prince Gong as a consultant. At a meeting presided by the Emperor, Yulan and Prince Gong advocate making peace with Western powers, against the majority of the military officials. Yulan's first attempt to directly interfere with government affairs proves successful, as the Emperor accepts her proposal and orders a peace talk at Tungchow, where a heavy Qing Army is stationed.

At Tongzhou, British envoy Harry Parkes insists the British and French delegations will make a high-profile entrance into Peking and refuses to salute the Qing Emperor with genuflection. Sengge Rinchen, who was defeated at the Battle of Taku Forts before, angrily reprimands Parkes and challenges him to a wrestling match. Sengge Rinchen beats Parkes and takes the foreign delegations into custody. As the negotiations broke down, the cavalry-dominated Qing Army suffers disastrous losses at the Battle of Palikao.

The fall of Palikao putting Peking at imminent risk, the Xianfeng Emperor has no choice but to flee to the Summer Resort in Jehol along with the imperial court and to appoint Prince Gong to be in charge of negotiations. The British and French troops enter the Chinese capital. Although Qing resistance is too weak against the firearms-equipped Western powers, a peasant family volunteers to defend the city and kills many soldiers of the joint expeditionary force. The joint army enters the now-emptied Yuanming Garden to hunt for the volunteers, disregarding the weak protest from Qing officials. On 18 October 1860, Lord Elgin orders the sacking and complete destruction of the "Palace of All Palaces" with a fire that lasts for three days. The narrator states that the ruins of Yuanming Garden serve as a reminder of "national humiliation".

Cast
 Liu Xiaoqing as Yulan, Noble Consort Yi
 Tony Leung Ka-fai as the Xianfeng Emperor
 Hong Kwan as Sushun
 Chan Wah as the Empress
 Wong Pui as Duanhua, Prince Zheng of the First Rank
 Zhang Tielin as Prince Gong
 Li Yan as Sengge Rinchen
 Pang Wanning as Harry Parkes

External links
 
 
 
 
 

Films set in the 1860s
Films directed by Li Han-hsiang
Films set in Beijing
Hong Kong drama films
1980s Mandarin-language films
1980s Cantonese-language films
Films set in 19th-century Qing dynasty
1983 drama films
1983 films
1980s Hong Kong films